Camp Washington-Carver Complex, also known as West Virginia 4-H Camp for Negroes, is a historic camp and national historic district located near Clifftop, Fayette County, West Virginia.  The district encompasses four contributing buildings and two contributing structures, the most notable being the Great Chestnut Lodge, a log building of unusual size and structural character. It is the largest log structure built entirely of chestnut in West Virginia. It was built in 1941–1942, and is a 1 1/2 story building in the form of a modified Latin cross with a gabled block (Assembly Hall) and a gabled wing or ell (Dining Hall). Also on the property are a log cottage (1940), two frame dormitories (1942), a water tower (1940), and a small pond (1940). The camp was established by an act of the West Virginia legislature in 1937, and developed as a project of the Works Progress Administration starting in 1939.

It was listed on the National Register of Historic Places in 1980.

References

External links

African-American history of West Virginia
1941 establishments in West Virginia
Buildings and structures in Fayette County, West Virginia
Historic districts in Fayette County, West Virginia
National Register of Historic Places in Fayette County, West Virginia
Washington Carver
Works Progress Administration in West Virginia
Rustic architecture in West Virginia
Historic districts on the National Register of Historic Places in West Virginia
Log buildings and structures on the National Register of Historic Places in West Virginia
Temporary populated places on the National Register of Historic Places